Centre Market Place is a one block long street in Lower Manhattan, New York City, bordering Mulberry Street to the east, Grand Street to the south, Broome Street to the north, and Centre Street to the west. Centre Market Place was originally an extension of Orange Street (now Baxter Street, which starts at Grand Street, where Centre Market Place ends), before being formally renamed Centre Market Place in April 1837, after Centre Market, which was west of the street.  At one time, the street was at the top of a high hill. Currently, local residents consider Centre Market Place to be part of the NoLIta neighborhood.
At the southern end of the street, on the corner of Grand Street, is Onieal's restaurant, which features a cavernous wine cellar that once served as a speakeasy during Prohibition. Gentlemen of means would walk through the front of the Police Building, perhaps make a contribution to the "widows and orphan fund" and then walk through the cellar corridor connecting the two buildings.

9 Centre Market Place was once the location to "The People's Bath House", a privately run public bathhouse built by the Association for Improving the Condition of the Poor. The People's Baths served as a model to which the City of New York would later build the city's truly public bathhouses.

The block also included several gun stores including the John Jovino at 5 Centre Market Place, and the older Frank Lava Gunsmith at 6 Centre Market Place. The gun stores were part of a gun district owing to its proximity to the police headquarters at 240 Centre St.
A row of townhouses at No. 1, 2, 4, and 5 were rehabilitated by two developers, a husband-and-wife team, incorporating found architectural castoffs scavenged from around the world as part of its facade.

The street was home to many well-known writers, poets, and artists, including the noted crime photographer Weegee, who lived in a small studio apartment at 5 Centre Market Pl.

References
Notes

External links

 Centre Market Place storefronts—photographs of all storefronts on Centre Market Pl.

Streets in Manhattan